Lionel John Victor Farmery (25 April 1901 – q1 1971) was an English professional footballer who played as a goalkeeper in the Football League for Doncaster Rovers and York City, in non-League football for Bentley Colliery and was on the books of Hull City and Bradford City without making a league appearance.

References

1901 births
Footballers from Doncaster
1971 deaths
English footballers
Association football goalkeepers
Hull City A.F.C. players
Bradford City A.F.C. players
Doncaster Rovers F.C. players
York City F.C. players
Bentley Colliery F.C. players
English Football League players